József Kovács (1929 – 1991) was a Hungarian wrestler. He competed in two events at the 1952 Summer Olympics.

References

External links
 

1929 births
1991 deaths
Hungarian male sport wrestlers
Olympic wrestlers of Hungary
Wrestlers at the 1952 Summer Olympics
People from Csongrád
Sportspeople from Csongrád-Csanád County